The following is a timeline of the history of the city of Salerno in the Campania region of Italy.

Prior to 20th century

 197 BCE - Roman colony Salernum founded at site of former Etruscan town Irnthi.(it)
 5th-7th C. CE - Roman Catholic diocese of Salerno established.
 646 CE - Salerno becomes part of the Lombard Duchy of Benevento.
 774 CE - Duke Arechis II of Benevento relocates to Salerno.
 9th C. - Schola Medica Salernitana (medical school) founded.
 851 - Principality of Salerno established.
 870s - Salerno besieged by Arab forces.
 1076  - Salerno taken by forces of Norman Robert Guiscard.
 1084 - Saint Matthew Cathedral consecrated by Pope Gregory VII.
 1150 - University founded.
 1194 - Salerno sacked by forces of Henry VI, Holy Roman Emperor.
 1260 - Port of Salerno construction begins.
 1419 - Salerno becomes part of the Kingdom of Naples and administrative centre of its .
 1578 - Salerno sacked by "Muslim pirates."
 1656 - Plague.
 1688 - Earthquake.
 1694 - Earthquake.
 1799 - Salerno becomes part of the French client Parthenopean Republic.
 1817 - University closed.
 1843 -  (library) founded.
 1860 -  (administrative region) established.
 1866 - Naples–Salerno railway begins operating; Salerno railway station opens.
 1872 -  opens.
 1875 - Frusta newspaper begins publication.
 1895 - Salerno–Reggio Calabria railway in operation.
 1896 - L'Eco newspaper begins publication.
 1897 - Population: 37,310.

20th century

 1902 -  (railway) begins operating.
 1911 - Population: 45,682.
 1919 - U.S. Salernitana 1919 (football club) formed.
 1920 -  (history society) founded.
 1926 - Salerno Costa d'Amalfi Airport established.
 1936 - Population: 67,186.(it)
 1937 -  begins operating.
 1943 - 9 September: Salerno besieged by Allied forces during World War II.
 1944 - Salerno is Capital of Italy for some months
 April: Communist  made in Salerno.
 1946 - Festival del cinema di Salerno begins.
 1954 - 25 October: .
 1956 - Local election held;  becomes mayor (until 1970).
 1961 - Population: 117,363.(it)
 1964 -  (transit entity) formed.
 1968 - University of Salerno established.
 1971 - Population: 155,498.(it)
 1982 - 26 August:  occurs in the  quartiere.
 1990 - Stadio Arechi (stadium) opens.
 1993 - Vincenzo De Luca becomes mayor.
 1998 -  (park) opens.

21st century

 2013
 Salerno metropolitan railway service begins operating.
 Population: 131,925.
 2016 - Vincenzo Napoli becomes mayor.

See also
 
 List of mayors of Salerno
 List of Princes of Salerno, 9th-16th centuries
 List of bishops of Salerno
  (state archives)
 Campania history (region)

Other cities in the macroregion of South Italy:(it)
 Timeline of Bari, Apulia region
 Timeline of Brindisi, Apulia
 Timeline of L'Aquila, Abruzzo region
 Timeline of Naples, Campania region
 Timeline of Reggio Calabria
 Timeline of Taranto, Apulia

References

This article incorporates information from the Italian Wikipedia.

Bibliography

in English

in Italian
 
  (also includes chronology)

External links

  (city archives)
 Items related to Salerno, various dates (via Europeana)
 Items related to Salerno, various dates (via Digital Public Library of America)

 
Salerno
Salerno